The Antigo Post Office is the post office serving the city of Antigo, Wisconsin. The post office was built in 1916 in the Classical Revival style using brick, with limestone and granite features; at the time, it cost $60,000 to build. Antigo has had a post office since 1879; however, this post office was the first owned by the federal government. The post office was added to the National Register of Historic Places on October 24, 2000; it is one of 27 post offices on the National Register in Wisconsin.

References

Post office buildings on the National Register of Historic Places in Wisconsin
Neoclassical architecture in Wisconsin
Government buildings completed in 1916
Buildings and structures in Langlade County, Wisconsin
National Register of Historic Places in Langlade County, Wisconsin